Daniel Raynes Goodwin (1811–1890) was an American Episcopal clergyman and academic. He was the fourth President of Trinity College in Hartford, Connecticut, and the thirteenth provost of the University of Pennsylvania.

Biography
Daniel Raynes Goodwin was born in North Berwick, Maine on April 12, 1811, graduated from Bowdoin College in 1832, and served as thirteenth President of University of Pennsylvania.

He died at his home in Philadelphia on March 15, 1890.

An oil portrait of Daniel Raynes Goodwin is in the collection of the Strawbery Banke Museum in Portsmouth, New Hampshire.  The home of Goodwin's brother, Ichabod Goodwin, who was governor of New Hampshire, is also on the grounds of the Strawbery Banke Museum.

References

External links
 Portrait of Daniel Raynes Goodwin at Strawbery Banke Museum

1811 births
1890 deaths
American Episcopal clergy
People from North Berwick, Maine
Bowdoin College alumni
Presidents of Trinity College (Connecticut)
19th-century American Episcopalians
19th-century American clergy